Giuseppe Fappiano (July 16, 1905 – December 23, 1984), known as Joseph C. Nichols was an American sports journalist. A columnist for The New York Times, he won the Elmer Ferguson Memorial Award in 1984 and is a member of the media section of the Hockey Hall of Fame.  He joined the Times in 1923 as a copy boy, and became a reporter in 1925. Besides hockey, he also covered boxing and thoroughbred racing. He retired in 1975 and died of a heart attack in 1984.

References

1905 births
1984 deaths
20th-century American non-fiction writers
American sports journalists
Elmer Ferguson Award winners